The Usno Formation is a palaeontological formation located in Ethiopia. It dates to the Pliocene period.

Geology

Paleofauna

See also 
 List of fossil sites
 List of fossiliferous stratigraphic units in Ethiopia

References

  (1993); Wildlife of Gondwana. Reed. 

Geologic formations of Ethiopia
Pliocene Series of Africa
Pleistocene Series of Africa